Totamore Dun is a dun located at ; near the settlement of Totamore, on the Inner Hebridean island of Coll. The dun was protected by wall which would at one time have been about 3m thick; and would have run along the summit. The current condition of the wall is, however, very poor and only a few fragments of it survive today. Only a single facing-stone remains on the southern side of the entrance.

References

Archaeological sites in the Northern Inner Hebrides
Coll
Fortifications in Scotland